Elections were held in Illinois on Tuesday, November 7, 1972.

Primaries were held on March 21, 1972.

Election information

Turnout
Turnout in the primary election was 39.90%, with a total of 2,228,605 ballots cast. 1,563,193 Democratic and 665,412 Republican primary ballots were cast.

Turnout during the general election was 78.52%, with 4,880,213 ballots cast.

Federal elections

United States President 

Illinois voted for the Republican ticket of Richard Nixon and Spiro Agnew.

United States Senate 

Incumbent Charles H. Percy, a Republican, won reelection.

United States House 

All 24 Illinois seats in the United States House of Representatives were up for election in 1972. Seats had seen redistricting due to the results of the 1970 United States Census. Illinois did not lose any congressional seats during reapportionment. , this is the last time that Illinois has not lost any congressional districts during a post-census reapportionment.

Before the election, both the Democratic and Republican parties held 12 seats from Illinois. In 1972, Republicans won 14 seats, while Democrats won 10 seats.

State elections

Governor and Lieutenant Governor

Incumbent Republican Richard B. Ogilvie lost to Democrat Dan Walker.

Incumbent Lieutenant Governor Paul Simon did not seek reelection to a second term, instead opting to (ultimately unsuccessfully) seek the Democratic nomination for governor. Democrat Neil Hartigan was elected to succeed him.

This was the first gubernatorial elections in which gubernatorial and lieutenant gubernatorial candidates were elected on a ticket in the general election, per the 1970 Constitution of Illinois.

Attorney General 

Incumbent Attorney General William J. Scott, a Republican, was elected to a second term.

Democratic primary
Illinois State Senator Thomas G. Lyons won the Democratic primary, running unopposed.

Republican primary
Incumbent William J. Scott won the Republican primary, running unopposed.

General election

Secretary of State 

Incumbent Secretary of State John W. Lewis Jr., a Republican, had been appointed in 1970. He did not seek reelection. Democrat Michael Howlett was elected to succeed him in office.

Democratic primary
Illinois Auditor of Public Accounts Michael J. Howlett won the Democratic primary, running unopposed.

Republican primary
Edmund J. Kucharski won the Republican primary, running unopposed.

General election

Comptroller 

Comptroller was a newly formed office, created by the 1970 Constitution of Illinois to replace the office of Auditor of Public Accounts, of which the outgoing incumbent was Democrat Michael Howlett, who instead opted to run for Secretary of State. Republican George W. Lindberg was elected the inaugural Illinois Comptroller.

Democratic primary
Dean Barringer won the Democratic primary, running unopposed.

Republican primary
George W. Lindberg won the Republican primary, running unopposed.

General election

State Senate
Seats of the Illinois Senate were up for election in 1972. Republicans flipped control of the chamber.

State House of Representatives
Seats in the Illinois House of Representatives were up for election in 1972. Republicans retained control of the chamber.

Trustees of University of Illinois

An election was held for three of nine seats for Trustees of University of Illinois system.

The election saw the reelection of three-term former member Republican Park Livingston and first-term Republican incumbent Ralph Crane Hahn, as well as the election of new Republican member Jane S. Hayes Rader.

Democratic incumbent Robert B. Pogue (elected in a special election two years earlier) lost reelection.

Judicial elections
Multiple judicial positions were up for election in 1972.

Local elections
Local elections were held.

References

 
Illinois